XHQH-FM is a radio station in Ixmiquilpan, Hidalgo, Mexico broadcasting on 106.7 FM. It carries La Ke Buena grupera format from Radiópolis.

History
XEQH-AM 1270 received its concession on October 15, 1985. It was owned by Miguel Galindo Amador. Milenium Orbital acquired it in 2004 and raised its power from 1 kW to 3.

It migrated to FM after being cleared in 2012.

References

Radio stations in Hidalgo (state)
Radio stations established in 1985
1985 establishments in Mexico